Dinger may refer to:

People
Dinger (surname)
Dinger Doane (1893–1949), American football player
von Dinger, a Bavarian noble family

Other uses
The mascot for Colorado Rockies baseball team
Slang term for home run in baseball
A bell-headed muppet from the children's television show Sesame Street
A pseudonym/nickname for SAS Bravo Two Zero patrol member, Ian Pring
A character in the 1989 film Dream a Little Dream
Dinger or dingir, the Ancient Sumerian word for "god"
Nickname for American NASCAR driver A. J. Allmendinger

See also

 
 
 Ding (disambiguation)
 Dinge
 Binger
 Pinger (disambiguation)